McQuin Baron (born 27 October 1995) is a water polo player from the United States. He was part of the American team at the 2016 Summer Olympics, where the team finished in tenth place.

See also
 List of men's Olympic water polo tournament goalkeepers

References

External links
 

Living people
1995 births
American male water polo players
Water polo goalkeepers
Olympic water polo players of the United States
Water polo players at the 2016 Summer Olympics
Pan American Games gold medalists for the United States
Pan American Games medalists in water polo
Water polo players at the 2015 Pan American Games
Medalists at the 2015 Pan American Games